John Emmerson may refer to:
 John Emmerson (cricketer), English cricketer
 John K. Emmerson, American diplomat
 John McLaren Emmerson, Australian physicist, barrister, and collector of rare books

See also
 John Emerson (disambiguation)